Francis Jeffrey Bell (Calcutta, 26 January 1855 - London, 1 April 1924) was an English zoologist who specialised in echinoderms. He spent most of his life at the British Museum (Natural History), and was also a professor of comparative anatomy at King's College.

His author abbreviation is Bell.

Life 
Bell was born in Calcutta on 26 January 1855, the son of Francis Jeffrey Bell. He went to school at Christ's Hospital in London. In January 1874 he enrolled as a student at Magdalen College, Oxford, where he studied zoology and pursued comparative anatomy under George Rolleston. He graduated cum laude in 1878 with a BA in natural science. In that year he also received an appointment as assistant in the zoological department of the British Museum (Natural History), under Albert Günther. He retained that post until his retirement in 1919. In 1878, his translation of Gegenbaur's "Grundzüge der vergleichenden Anatomie" (1859) appeared as "Elements of Comparative Anatomy," which has long been used as a reference work. He obtained his MA in Oxford in 1881. In 1885 he himself published the "Manual of Comparative Anatomy and Physiology", which became a widely used work among medical students. From 1879 to 1897 he was a professor of comparative anatomy at King's College. In 1897 he became professor emeritus and fellow of that college.

In addition to being the author of a number of works on anatomy, Bell is best known for his many publications on echinoderms. In 1892 he published the standard work "Catalog of the British Echinoderms in the British Museum".

Francis Jeffrey Bell died on 1 April 1924 as a result of an accident.

Publications

References

 Obituary: Prof. F. Jeffrey Bell Nature 113: 541 (12 April 1924)
  (1922). The Magdalen College Record, third issue: 16
 King's Collections: Bell, Francis Jeffrey
  (1988). Francis Jeffrey Bell in: Founders of British physiology: 196
  (2014) Biographical Database of Southern African Science
(translated from the Netherlands wikipedia article: Francis Jeffrey Bell - which appears to be almost a direct translation of Murray)

British zoologists
British marine biologists
British physiologists